Introducing Hedzoleh Soundz is the fifteenth studio album by South African trumpeter Hugh Masekela. It was recorded in Lagos, Nigeria, and released in 1973. The track "Languta" was later included in his 2004 album Still Grazing.

Background
Hedzoleh Soundz were a band from Accra, Ghana formed in the late 1960s. The word Hedzoleh means freedom in the Ga language. The album contains eight tracks: six are written by Hedzoleh, one by Masekela, and one is traditional. Their original melodies were based on traditional Akan and Ewe music and employed dark, organic-sounding African drums instead of modern western congas. Hugh Masekela was introduced to Hedzoleh by Fela Kuti. In addition to this album, Masekela recorded two more with Hedzoleh: I am Not Afraid and The Boy's Doin' It.

Track listing

Personnel
Congas, vocals – James Kwaku Morton
Congas, vocals, flute – Nat "Leepuma" Hammond
Design, cover – Milton Glaser
Drums – Acheampong Welbeck
Electric bass, vocals – Stanley Kwesi Todd
Engineer – Rik Pekkonen
Guitar – Richard Neesai "Jagger" Botchway
Mastered by – Arnie Acosta
Percussion, vocals – Samuel Nortey
Producer – Stewart Levine
Talking drum, vocals, percussion – Isaac Asante

References

External links

1973 albums
Hugh Masekela albums
Albums produced by Stewart Levine
Blue Thumb Records albums